Power of a Woman is the second studio album by the British R&B vocal group Eternal, released in October 1995. It was the band's first album without former member Louise who left the group to pursue a solo career. According to Billboard, as of February 1997, Power of a Woman has sold two million copies worldwide. In June 2019, Power of a Woman was ranked at number 25 on the Official Charts Company's list of the "top 40 biggest girl band studio albums of the last 25 years".

Overview
The album was a success and charted at number 6 in the UK Albums Chart in 1995. Eternal worked with new producers, giving them a slightly more R&B feel than their previous album Always & Forever. Power of a Woman received a positive reaction from critics, and the album was later re-released with a bonus disc featuring dance remixes.

Power of a Woman gave Eternal another 4 top 10 singles, "Power of a Woman", "I Am Blessed", and remixed versions of "Good Thing" and "Secrets". "It Will Never End" was planned to be the fifth release, but this was later cancelled due to Eternal releasing "Someday", which was the theme tune to Disney's 1996 film The Hunchback of Notre Dame. Redemption Song was also scheduled to be a single but was scrapped when the trio were chosen to record Someday. Redemption Song would've acted as the fourth single.

In 1996 the album was re-released as a two CD set. CD one was the same as the prior release and CD two was titled "The Number On Dance Mixes" and included six remixes of previous singles. The Australian version of the album includes their debut single "Stay" as a bonus track at the end of the album.

Track listing

Charts

Weekly charts

Year-end charts

Certifications

References

1995 albums
Eternal (band) albums